Tom Middlehurst (born 25 June 1936, Ormskirk, Lancashire) is a Welsh Labour Party politician and former member of the National Assembly for Wales for the Alyn and Deeside and a former Minister for Post-16 Education and Training.

Middlehust is also a former councillor having served on Alyn and Deeside District Council between 1986–95 and then on Flintshire County Council where he served as leader between 1995 and 1999.

Elected in the inaugural Assembly Elections on 1999, Middlehurst a well respected Council Leader was appointed by Alun Michael to his first government. The government he was part of was operating as a minority government and plans were being drawn up to form a coalition between Labour and the Liberal Democrats. Middlehurst resigned from the government on 9 October claiming he could not "contemplate sitting down at the Cabinet table with the Liberal Democrats".

He retired from the Assembly in 2003.

References

Profile on BBC Website September 1999

External links
Welsh Labour Party Website

Living people
Councillors in Wales
Wales AMs 1999–2003
Welsh Labour members of the Senedd
Members of the Welsh Assembly Government
Alumni of Liverpool John Moores University
1936 births
People from Ormskirk